Agesipolis may refer to:
Agesipolis I, king of the Agiad dynasty in Sparta, from 394 BC to 380 BC
Agesipolis II, king of the Agiad dynasty in Sparta, from 371 to 369 BC
Agesipolis III (died 183 BC), the last Agiad king of Sparta, 219 to 215 BC

Greek masculine given names